The Pingliang–Mianyang Expressway, commonly referred to as the Pingmian Expressway is an expressway that connects the cities of Pingliang, Gansu, China, and Mianyang, Sichuan. 

The Pingliang–Tianshui section includes the  Guangshan tunnel through the Liupan Mountains.

Current status

References

Chinese national-level expressways
Expressways in Gansu
Expressways in Sichuan